Eleonora Bergman (born 1947) is a Polish architecture historian who worked on the preservation of Jewish heritage in Poland. She was director of the Jewish Historical Institute in Warsaw from 2007 to 2011.

Biography
She studied architecture at the Warsaw University of Technology, going on to work at the  Institute of Urban Planning and Architecture. She later researched architectural monuments in Poland for the Arts Institute of the Polish Academy of Sciences. In 1991, she began work with the Jewish Historical Institute, documenting Jewish religious buildings and landmarks.

Bergman received her PhD from the Institute of Art History of the University of Warsaw in 1997.

Selected publications
She has published a number of articles and monographs; she has also published several books, including:
 Zachowane synagogi i domy modlitwy w Polsce: katalog (1996), with 
 Nurt mauretański w architekturze synagog Europy Środkowo-Wschodniej w XIX i na początku XX wieku (2004)
 Nie masz bóżnicy powszechnej. Synagogi i domy modlitwy w Warszawie od końca XVIII do początku XXI wieku (2007)
Bergman serves as a member of the council of the Auschwitz-Birkenau Foundation.

Awards and honours
In 2012, she was awarded the French Legion of Honour.

References 

1947 births
Living people
20th-century Polish historians
University of Warsaw alumni
20th-century Polish Jews
21st-century Polish Jews
Chevaliers of the Légion d'honneur
Polish women academics
Women historians